Mario M. DeOptatis (January 26, 1903 – January 28, 1979) was an American lawyer and politician from New York.

Life
He was born on January 26, 1903, in New York City. He attended Public School No. 112, New York University, Fordham Law School and Brooklyn Law School.

DeOptatis was a member of the New York State Senate (14th D.) from 1949 to 1954, sitting in the 167th, 168th and 169th New York State Legislatures.

He died on January 28, 1979.

References

1903 births
1979 deaths
Democratic Party New York (state) state senators
Politicians from Brooklyn
New York University alumni
Fordham University School of Law alumni
Brooklyn Law School alumni
20th-century American politicians